Amydria arizonella is a moth of the family Acrolophidae. It is found in North America, including Arizona and South Carolina.

References

Moths described in 1905
Acrolophidae